Larisa Nikolayevna Kruglova (born 27 October 1972 in Murmansk) is a Russian sprinter who mainly competes in the 100 metres.

Her greatest success has come in relay races, where she has Olympic silver medal to her name.

Achievements

Personal bests
100 metres - 11.20 s (2006)
200 metres - 22.84 s (2004)

External links 

1972 births
Living people
People from Murmansk
Russian female sprinters
Athletes (track and field) at the 2004 Summer Olympics
Olympic silver medalists for Russia
Olympic athletes of Russia
World Athletics Championships medalists
European Athletics Championships medalists
Medalists at the 2004 Summer Olympics
Olympic silver medalists in athletics (track and field)
Olympic female sprinters
Sportspeople from Murmansk Oblast